Nomisma was the ancient Greek word for "money" and is derived from nomos (νόμος) anything assigned, a usage, custom, law, ordinance".

The term nomos may also refer to an approximately 8 gram Achaean coin denomination.

Other uses
In Modern Greek, the word nomisma means "currency". It is also a term used by numismatists when  referring to the pieces of money or coin in the plural nomismata an example of which is the Aes rude of Numa Pompilius (the 2nd King of Rome).

See also
Aristotle
Numismatics
Roman Republican coinage

References

Citations

Bibliography
Ancient Greek-NOMISMA: "money", The King James Version (KJV) New Testament Greek Lexicon; Strong's Number:3546 
Aristotle, NICOMACHEAN ETHICS [1133b 1], translations: a) Thomas Taylor ; b) Sir (William) David Ross KBE ; c) Harris Rackham 
Contemporatary Greek-NOMISMA: "currency"
Pliny the Elder, The Natural History,BOOK XXXIV. THE NATURAL HISTORY OF METALS. CHAP. 1. (1.)--THE ORES OF BRASS., Editions and translations: English (ed. John Bostock and Henry Thomas Riley| Latin (ed. Karl  Friedrich Theodor Mayhoff)

Currency
Coins
Greek words and phrases
Numismatics